This article shows all participating team squads at the 2012 FIVB Volleyball Men's Club World Championship, held from October 13 to 19, 2012 in Doha, Qatar.

Pool A

Trentino Diatec

Head Coach:  Radostin Stoychev

Sada Cruzeiro

Head Coach:  Marcelo Méndez

Al-Rayyan

Head Coach:  Igor Arbutina

Tigres de la UANL
Head Coach:  Jorge Azair

Pool B

Zenit Kazan

Head Coach:  Vladimir Alekno

PGE Skra Bełchatów

Head Coach:  Jacek Nawrocki

Zamalek

Head Coach:  Mohamed Ellakany

Al-Arabi

Head Coach:  Mauro Grasso

References

External links
Official website

C
2012 in volleyball